The Tulloch Stakes is an Australian Turf Club Group 2 Thoroughbred horse race, for three-year-old colts and geldings, at set weights, over a distance of 2000 metres, held annually at Rosehill Racecourse in Sydney Australia. Total prize money for the race is A$200,000.

History

The race is in honour of champion Tulloch, who as a three-year-old in 1957 won 14 out of 16 races he competed in.

Name
1973–1986 - Tulloch Stakes
1987–1989 - Carringbush Cup
1990–1995 - Tulloch Stakes
1996–2001 - Tulloch Wine Stakes
2002–2007 - Tulloch Stakes
2008–2011 - Myer Tulloch Stakes
2012 onwards - Tulloch Stakes

Venue
2022 - Newcastle Racecourse

Distance
1973–1978 – 1850 metres
1979–2021 – 2000 metres
2022 – 1850 metres
2023 onwards – 2000 metres

Grade
1973–1978 - Principal Race
1979 onwards - Group 2

Winners

 2022 - Character 
 2021 - Yaletown
2020 - Quick Thinker
2019 - Angel Of Truth
2018 - Levendi
2017 - Jon Snow
2016 - Old North
 2015 - Hauraki
 2014 - Gallatin
 2013 - Philippi
 2012 - Polish Knight
 2011 - Fast Clip
 2010 - Count Encosta
 2009 - Harris Tweed
 2008 - Book Of Kells
 2007 - Tipungwuti
 2006 - Manton
 2005 - Stella Grande
 2004 - Starcraft
 2003 - Natural Blitz
 2002 - Prince Of War
 2001 - Zareyev
 2000 - Shogun Lodge
 1999 - Lease
 1998 - Northern Drake
 1997 - Heroes Return
 1996 - Peep On The Sly
 1995 - Ivory's Irish
 1994 - Mahogany
 1993 - The Bill
 1992 - Zamination
 1991 - Durbridge
 1990 - Fill The Bill
 1989 - Our Krona
 1988 - Mighty Willem
 1987 - Our Palliser
 1986 - Periscope
 1985 - Prince Frolic
 1984 - Prolific
 1983 - Hermod
 1982 - Binbinga
 1981 - Ring the Bell
 1980 - Prince Ruling
 1979 - Career  
 1978 - Lefroy  
 1977 - Ming Dynasty  
 1976 - Balmerino  
 1975 - Mansingh  
 1974 - Asgard  
 1973 - Longfella

See also
 List of Australian Group races
 Group races

External links 
Tulloch Stakes (ATC)

References

Horse races in Australia